Joscelin II of Edessa (died 1159) was the fourth and last ruling count of Edessa.  He was son of his predecessor Joscelin I of Edessa and Beatrice, daughter of Constantine I of Armenia.

Biography
In 1122, Joscelin I was captured by Belek Ghazi. The next year, he was joined in captivity by Baldwin II of Jerusalem. Joscelin I was rescued in 1123 by Armenian soldiers, and he worked with Baldwin's wife Morphia to secure the king's release. The young Joscelin II and Baldwin's daughter Joveta were ransomed for Baldwin's release in 1124. Joscelin II and Joveta were released in 1125 in exchange for 80,000 dinars, spoils from Baldwin's victory over al-Bursuqi at the battle of Azaz. In 1131, his father Joscelin I was wounded in battle with the Danishmends, and Edessa passed to Joscelin II. Joscelin II refused to march the small Edessan army out to meet the Danishmends, so Joscelin I, in his last act, forced the Danishmends to retreat, dying soon after.

Joscelin II ruled the weakest and most isolated of the Crusader states. In 1138 he allied with Antioch and Byzantine emperor John II Komnenos to attack Zengi, atabeg of Aleppo, and the campaign ended with the unsuccessful Siege of Shaizar of 1138.  Upon returning to Antioch, Joscelin II exploited local sentiment against the Byzantine Empire to instigate a riot that forced John to return home.

In 1143 both John II and Fulk of Jerusalem died, leaving Joscelin II with no powerful allies to help defend Edessa. In autumn 1144, Joscelin II formed an alliance with the Artuqid Kara Aslan and marched a sizable army north to assist in their struggle with Zengi. With the capital only lightly defended, Zengi redirected his army, invading and capturing the city after the Siege of Edessa in 1144. Joscelin II fled to Turbessel, where he held the remnants of the county west of the Euphrates.

After Yarankash, a Frankish slave, assassinated Zengi in September 1146, Joscelin II recaptured Edessa in October 1146. Receiving no help from the other Crusader states, the city was again lost in November, as Joscelin's expedition was driven out by Zengi's son Nur ad-Din. The Second Crusade, called in response to the fall of Edessa, shifted its focus to Damascus. In 1150 while en route to Antioch to enlist help, Joscelin II was taken prisoner by Nur-ed-Din's Turkomans. Joscelin II was taken to the city of Aleppo where he was led before a hostile crowd and publicly blinded. He spent the remaining nine years of his life in captivity in a Muslim prison. He died in the dungeons of the Citadel of Aleppo in 1159.

Family
He married Beatrice of Saone, the widow of the wealthy Antiochene baron, William of Zardana. She gave birth to at least two daughters and a son surviving to adulthood:

 Agnes of Courtenay married Amalric I of Jerusalem, later king of Jerusalem.  After her divorce from Amalric, she held the lands and incomes of the County of Jaffa. Joscelin II's grandchildren Baldwin IV of Jerusalem and Sibylla of Jerusalem were in turn monarchs of Jerusalem, as was his great-grandson Baldwin V of Jerusalem.
 Joscelin III of Edessa held the nominal title Count of Edessa, being in reality the lord of a small seigneurie near Acre.
 Isabella of Courtenay, possibly married Thoros II, Prince of Armenia had two daughters.

Notes

References

Year of birth missing
1159 deaths
Counts of Edessa
1st house of Courtenay
Christians of the Second Crusade
People who died in prison custody